Antrix Corporation Limited is an Indian government-owned company under the administrative control of the Department of Space. It was incorporated in September 1992, as a commercial and marketing arm of ISRO by prompting, commercially delivering and marketing products and services emanating from ISRO. It provides major technical consultancy services and transfers technologies to industry.

History 
Antrix Corporation was incorporated on 28 September 1992 as a private limited company owned by the Indian government.
Its objective is to promote the ISRO's products, services and technologies. The company is a Public Sector Undertaking (PSU), wholly owned by the Government of India. It is administered by the Department of Space (DoS).

It had dealings with EADS Astrium, Intelsat, Avanti Group, WorldSpace, Inmarsat, SES World Skies, Measat, Singtel  and other space institutions in Europe, Middle East and South East Asia.

It was awarded 'Miniratna Category-I' status by the government in 2008.

Achievements
Original Article : List of PSLV launches
Successful launch of W2M satellite for Eutelsat.
 Successful supply of reliable satellite systems and sub-systems. Some of Antrix'''s better known customers are Hughes, Matra Marconi, World Space etc.
 Successful Commercial Satellite Launches of SPOT 687 (France), Pathfinder & Dove (U.S), Tecsar (Israel) Kitsat (Korea), Tubsat (DLR – Germany), BIRD (DLR – Germany), PROBA (Verhaert, Belgium) aboard the ISRO's Polar Satellite Launch Vehicle (PSLV).
 Execution of many IOT / TTC support services to International Space Agencies. Some of the customers used Antrix'' services are World Space, PanAmSat, GE, Americom, AFRISAT etc.

Business agreement 
On 29 January 2014, Antrix Corporation Limited (Antrix), the commercial arm of Indian Space Research Organization (ISRO), signed Launch Services Agreement with DMC International Imaging (DMCii), the wholly owned subsidiary of Surrey Satellite Technology Limited (SSTL), United Kingdom (UK), for launch of three DMC-3 Earth Observation Satellites being built by SSTL, on-board ISRO's Polar Satellite Launch Vehicle (PSLV).

On 5 February 2014, Antrix signed another Launch Services Agreement with ST Electronics (Satcom & Sensor Systems) Pte Ltd, Singapore, for launch of TeLEOS-1 Earth Observation Satellite, on-board PSLV. These launches are planned during end 2014 to end 2015. On 29 September 2014, Canada announced that it has decided to give the contract of the July 2015 launch of its M3M (Maritime Monitoring and Messaging Micro-Satellite) communications satellite to Antrix during the inauguration of the International Astronautical Congress at Toronto.

Satellite launches 

 ISRO has launched 343 foreign satellites for 36 different countries. All satellites were launched using the ISRO's Polar Satellite Launch Vehicle (PSLV) expendable launch system. Between 2013 and 2015, India launched 28 foreign satellites for 13 different countries earning a total revenue of US$101 million.

Controversies

S-band spectrum scam

In July 2008, Devas offloaded 17% of its stake to German company Deutsche Telekom for US$75 million, and by 2010 had 17 investors, including former ISRO scientists.

In late 2009, some ISRO insiders exposed information about the Devas-Antrix deal, and the ensuing investigations resulted in the deal being annulled. G. Madhavan Nair (ISRO Chairperson when the agreement was signed) was barred from holding any post under the Department of Space. Some former scientists were found guilty of "acts of commission" or "acts of omission". Devas and Deutsche Telekom demanded US$2 billion and US$1 billion, respectively, in damages.

The Central Bureau of Investigation concluded investigations into the Antrix-Devas scam and registered a case against the accused in the Antrix-Devas deal under Section 120-B, besides Section 420 of IPC and Section 13(2) read with 13(1)(d) of PC Act, 1988 on 18 March 2015 against the then executive director, Antrix Corporation Limited, Bengaluru; two officials of USA-based company; Bengaluru based private multi media company and other unknown officials of Antrix Corporation Limited /ISRO/Department of Space.

References

External links
 

Space programme of India
Commercial launch service providers
Government-owned companies of India
Companies based in Bangalore
Indian Space Research Organisation
Indian companies established in 1992
1992 establishments in Karnataka

mr:अंतरिक्ष